Rainier Square Tower is a mixed-use skyscraper in the Metropolitan Tract of downtown Seattle, Washington. The $600 million project was completed in 2020, and is the tallest building constructed in the city since the construction of the Columbia Center in 1985.

History

The University of Washington, which owns the Metropolitan Tract, announced their intent to redevelop the Rainier Square shopping center in late 2013. The shopping mall opened in 1978 and occupied three-fourths of the block around the existing Rainier Tower. The university's board of regents had previously proposed demolishing the mall for a 26-story hotel in 2000, but the proposal was shelved. In May 2014, the board of regents selected Wright Runstad to develop the property. In November 2015, Wright Runstad raised the tower's proposed height from 800 to 850 feet, with an additional eight stories of luxury apartments. On December 3, 2015, the city approved the master use plan, paving the way for construction to begin.

The Rainier Square shopping center was closed in August 2017 and site demolition began the following month. Amazon.com was announced as the sole lessee of the office portion in October 2017, occupying . In February 2019, Amazon announced that it would sublease the tower while considering other options. Steel core erection began in October 2018 and the building was topped out ten months later in August 2019. It was originally scheduled to be completed in August 2020, and was completed in September 2020.

The retail portion was planned to be occupied by an Equinox Fitness club and a PCC Community Markets store. PCC opened their store in January 2022. The 169-room hotel was originally planned to be operated by Equinox under their hotels division, but the building was replaced with an eight-story office building (named "400 University") in October 2019. 400 University was topped out in January 2021.

Design

Six levels of below-grade parking can accommodate up to 1,000 vehicles. The tower has a "sloping" appearance, starting with a wide base and gradually becoming slimmer at higher floors. Early designs had the taper beginning at a higher floor, but it was lowered so as not to obscure views of the unique "pedestal" base of Minoru Yamasaki's adjacent Rainier Tower.

The tower uses a "radical" shear wall core system that used steel plates in lieu of traditional rebar and formwork between concrete elements. This method reduced the amount of time needed to erect the floors of the tower.

A separate, ten-story building on the southwest corner of the site, 400 University, will have  and is set to open in 2021.

See also
 List of tallest buildings in Seattle

References

External links

 

NBBJ buildings
Skyscraper office buildings in Seattle
Skyscrapers in Seattle